Adugna Gurmu Deyas (born 13 July 1983 in Ethiopia) is an Ethiopian football goalkeeper.

Career
Deyas joined Ethiopian champions Saint-George SA in 2003.

Deyas is a member of the Ethiopia national football team, and was part of the Ethiopia squad at the 2001 FIFA World Youth Cup.

References

External links 

1983 births
Living people
Ethiopian footballers
Association football goalkeepers
Ethiopia international footballers